test is a command-line utility found in Unix, Plan 9, and Unix-like operating systems that evaluates conditional expressions. test was turned into a shell builtin command in 1981 with UNIX System III and at the same time made available under the alternate name [.

Overview
The test command in Unix evaluates the expression parameter. In most recent shell implementations, it is a shell builtin, even though the external version still exists. In the second form of the command, the [ ] (brackets) must be surrounded by blank spaces (this is because [ is a program and POSIX compatible shells require a space between the program name and its arguments). One must test explicitly for file names in the C shell. File-name substitution (globbing) causes the shell script to exit.

The test command is not to be confused with the [[ reserved word that was introduced with ksh88. The latter is not a command but part of the ksh88 syntax and does not apply file-name substitution to glob expressions.

The version of test bundled in GNU coreutils was written by Kevin Braunsdorf and Matthew Bradburn. The command is available as a separate package for Microsoft Windows as part of the UnxUtils collection of native Win32 ports of common GNU Unix-like utilities. The  command has also been ported to the IBM i operating system.

Syntax
 test expression
or
 [ expression ]

Arguments
The following arguments are used to construct this parameter:

 -e FileName - FileName exists

All remaining arguments return true if the object (file or string) exists, and the condition specified is true.

 -b Filename - Returns a True exit value if the specified FileName exists and is a block special file
 -c FileName - FileName is a character special file
 -d FileName - FileName is a directory
 
 -f FileName - FileName is a regular file
 -g FileName - FileName's Set Group ID bit is set
 -h FileName - FileName is a symbolic link
 -k FileName - FileName's sticky bit is set
 -L FileName - FileName is a symbolic link
 -p FileName - FileName is a named pipe (FIFO)
 -r FileName - FileName is readable by the current process
 -s FileName - FileName has a size greater than 0
 -t FileDescriptor - FileDescriptor is open and associated with a terminal
 -u FileName - FileName's Set User ID bit is set

 -w FileName - FileName's write flag is on. However, the FileName will not be writable on a read-only file system even if test indicates true

 -x FileName - FileName's execute flag is on
 If the specified file exists and is a directory, the True exit value indicates that the current process has permission to change cd into the directory.

Non standard Korn Shell extensions:
 file1 -nt file2 - file1 is newer than file2
 file1 -ot file2 - file1 is older than file2
 file1 -ef file2 - file1 is another name for file2 - (symbolic link or hard link)

String arguments
In Perl, these sections are reversed: eq is a string operator and == is a numerical operator, and so on for the others.

 -n String1 - the length of the String1 variable is nonzero
 -z String1 - the length of the String1 variable is 0 (zero)
 String1 = String2 - String1 and String2 variables are identical
 String1 != String2 - String1 and String2 variables are not identical
 String1 - true if String1 variable is not a null string

Number arguments
 Integer1 -eq Integer2 - Integer1 and Integer2 variables are algebraically equal
 -ne - not equal
 -gt - greater than
 -ge - greater or equal 
 -lt - less than
 -le - less or equal

Operators
test arguments can be combined with the following operators:
 ! - Unary negation operator
 -a - Binary AND operator
 -o - Binary OR operator (the -a operator has higher precedence than the -o operator)
 \(Expression\) - Parentheses for grouping must be escaped with a backslash \

The -a and -o operators, along with parentheses for grouping, are XSI extensions and are therefore not portable. In portable shell scripts, the same effect may be achieved by connecting multiple invocations of test together with the && and || operators and parentheses.

Exit status
This command returns the following exit values:

 0 - The Expression parameter is true
 1 - The Expression parameter is false or missing
 >1 - An error occurred

Examples
1. To test whether a file is nonexistent or empty, type:
 if test ! -s "$1"
 then
   echo $1 does not exist or is empty.
 fi
If the file specified by the first positional parameter to the shell procedure, $1, does not exist or is of size 0, the test command displays the message. If $1 exists and has a size greater than 0, the test command displays nothing.

Note: There must be a space between the -s function and the file name.

The quotation marks around $1 ensure that the test works properly even if the value of $1 is a null string. If the quotation marks are omitted and $1 is the empty string, the test command displays the error message:

 test: argument expected.

2. To do a complex comparison, type:
 if [ "$#" -lt 2 ] || ! [ -e "$1" ]
 then
   exit
 fi
If the shell procedure is given fewer than two positional parameters or the file specified by $1 does not exist, then the shell procedure exits. The special shell variable $# represents the number of positional parameters entered on the command line that starts this shell procedure.

See also
 List of Unix commands
 Unix shell
 find (Unix)

References

Further reading
 
 
  (free download)

External links

 
 
 

Unix SUS2008 utilities
Plan 9 commands
IBM i Qshell commands
Conditional constructs